The Gilani ministry began its operation into office on 31 March 2008 after Yousaf Raza Gillani was elected as Prime minister of Pakistan by the National Assembly on 25 March 2008. The swearing-in of the cabinet was delayed for a few days until March 31 because of differences arising amongst the coalition partners.

The leftist PPP gained substantial seats in the Parliament in the general elections held in 2008 but lacked enough seats to form a government with a simple majority. Initially with the coalition government, the conservative PML-N quickly departed when its leader, Nawaz Sharif (current Prime Minister), decided to lead the efforts on impeaching the former President Pervez Musharraf as well as restoring the judiciary, of which, the PML(N) played a centralized role.

Prime Minister Gillani decided to centralize the power by forming a more dense left-wing alliance that consisted of minor left parties: the ANP, MQM, JUI(F). As Prime Minister, Gillani escalated the military operations to keep pressure on Taliban and as well on the Baloch separatists. Gillani greatly relaxed the taxation that effected the annual GDP growth and initiated the welfare programme. Responding to global recession, Gillani implemented the nationalization of conglomerates and tightly controlled the means of production of the industries. Relations with Bangladesh, Afghanistan, and India worsen in 2008–12 as well criticism from the United States widened. In 2011, the U.S. initiated a secret operation to hunt down the Osama Bin Laden without the knowledge of Prime Minister Gillani. 
 
Prime Minister Gillani's ministry witnessed the sharp rise in nationwide violence, increased corruption in nationalized industries, social tension, political scandals and assassinations. After months of delaying the Supreme Court's recommendations to investigate the corruption cases against Benazir Bhutto, Gillani was ousted from the office; nonetheless, his ministry continued to be in effect by his successor. Overall ratings remains negative on Gillani as his tenure has been described as a "clash of state institutions, involving the executive, the armed forces and the judiciary." Under his ministry, Gillani was held responsible for the prolonged "Era of Stagflation", in which fundamental economic problems were ignored. In 2013, there was an increase in criticism of the Gillanian years, even after the NRO squabble was eventually resolved by his successor.

Gillani cabinet

Cabinet
At swearing-in ceremony, the PML(N) members declined to take oath under President General Pervez Musharraf, who they considered an illegitimate head of state. The first cabinet was short-lived lasting only 2 weeks; the list of federal ministers short-listed for the cabinet included two women members of the lower house and three members of the senate.

References

2008 establishments in Pakistan
Pakistan People's Party
Asif Ali Zardari
Yousaf Raza Gillani
Awami National Party
Jamiat Ulema-e-Islam (F)
Muttahida Qaumi Movement
2013 disestablishments in Pakistan